The B-Funk is the debut studio album by the British R&B and soul singer-songwriter Beverley Knight. It was released on 26 November 1995 by independent record label Dome Records.

Release and reception
The B-Funk was released in November 1995 on independent record label Dome Records. It received wide critical acclaim by the urban media in Britain with Echoes magazine labelling it "the best British soul album ever" and Billboard magazine stating that "this lady is on her way to becoming an international star." The album was also named Album of the Year by Blues & Soul in 1996, also earning Knight R&B Act of the Year at the 1996 Black Music Awards in London. However, the commercial success of the album did not match its critical acclaim, peaking at number 145 on the UK Albums Chart. In total, six singles were released from the album, including two releases of "Flavour of the Old School" and a limited edition international release of "Cast All Your Cares."

The album was the only LP released by Knight on Dome Records. After creative differences with the label, Knight decided to leave and sign a new contract with Parlophone Records in 1997. To capitalise on Knight's increased success at the label, Dome have subsequently re-released The B-Funk several times—the first being on 31 May 1999, after Knight won two awards at the MOBO Awards, and then again on 8 May 2006, after the top 10 success of her hits collection, Voice - The Best of Beverley Knight. On both occasions, the album was re-released with bonus remixes of the singles.

Track listing

Charts

References 

1995 debut albums
Beverley Knight albums
Hip hop soul albums